Rabbi Yechiel Yitzchak Perr (born 1935) is an American-born rabbi. He is the founder and rosh yeshiva of Yeshiva Derech Ayson (Yeshiva of Far Rockaway) in Far Rockaway, New York.

Biography 
Yechiel Yitzchak Perr grew up in South Ozone Park, Queens, where his father, Rabbi Menachem Mendel Perr served as a rabbi for over 50 years. Rabbi Perr attended high school at Mesivta Yeshiva Rabbi Chaim Berlin. After completing high school, he studied at the Talmudical Yeshiva of Philadelphia, and then at Lakewood Yeshiva in Lakewood, New Jersey under the tutelage of Rabbi Aharon Kotler from 1954 to 1962.

Perr married Shoshana Nekritz, daughter of Rabbi Yehuda Leib Nekritz, granddaughter of Rabbi Avraham Yaffen, and great-granddaughter of the Alter of Novardok, Rabbi Yosef Yozel Horwitz. It was after his marriage that he came into contact with the Novardok tradition. He went on to study at Yeshivat Beis Yosef-Novardok in Brooklyn, New York. In 1969, he established the Yeshiva of Far Rockaway, which also runs a high school and an accredited rabbinical studies program.

A series of his conversations on Mussar are recounted in the following books by Alan Morinis:
Climbing Jacob's Ladder. Broadway, 2002. .
Everyday Holiness: The Jewish Spiritual Path of Mussar. Trumpeter Books, 2007. .

Published works
"Reb Yisroel – Who Was He?" The Jewish Observer, June, 1969.
Tzidkus Stands Forever: The Life and Lessons of Rabbi Menachem M. Perr zt”l, September, 2011.
Shoshanas Ha'amakim: Parsha Lessons, Life Lessons, 2019.
מגילות רות ואסתר עם פירוש שושנת העמקים, ‎2020. A commentary on the books of Esther and Ruth, in Hebrew.
שושנת העמקים על מועדי השנה, ‎2021. Lectures on the festivals, in Hebrew.

Additionally, Rabbi Yehuda Keilson published two books, Mind Over Man and Faith Over Fear, based on Rabbi Perr's Mussar lectures on Madreigas Ha’adam.

On July 20, 2022, David Jemal published Choosing Not To Choose, based on Rabbi Perr's Mussar lectures on the Tekufos Ha'Olam section of the Madreigas Ha'adam.

References

External links
Rabbi Perr on Parshas Kedoshim
The Mussar Institute - Book reviews
 Tzidkus Stands Forever: The Life and Lessons of Rabbi Menachem M. Perr zt"l

1935 births
20th-century American rabbis
21st-century American rabbis
Beth Medrash Govoha alumni
Living people
Musar movement
Orthodox rabbis from New York City
People from Ozone Park, Queens
Jewish American writers
American spiritual teachers
Rosh yeshivas
Novardok Yeshiva alumni